Runn, is a lake in Dalarna in central Sweden, between the cities of Falun and Borlänge.

Runn has many islands and is popular for recreational boating in the summer.

In winter, Runn is popular for Tour skating and over 30 km of skating trails are plowed on the ice. Every February, 'Runn Winter Week' is held with many ice skating activities, including marathon Speed skating competitions.

Footnotes

External links

Lakes of Dalarna County